Circuitt is an upcoming Indian Marathi-language action thriller film directed by Aakash Pendharkar in his directorial debut. Produced by Madhur Bhadarkar under the banner of Bhandarkar Entertainment and Paragg Mehta. It is an remake of 2016 Malyalam film Kali. Vaibhav Tatwawadi and Hruta Durgule in lead roles. It is scheduled to be theatrically released on 7 April 2023.

Cast 

 Vaibhav Tatwawadi as Siddharth Mohite
 Hruta Durgule as Aarohi
Ramesh Pardeshi as Sarkar

Release

Theatrical 
The film is scheduled to be theatrically released on 7 April 2023.

Music 
Music is given by Abhijeet Kawthalkar and background score is by Aditya Bedekar and lyrics penned by Jitendra Joshi, Anand Pendharkar.

References

External links 

 

Indian action thriller films
2020s Marathi-language films
Marathi remakes of Malayalam films
2020s Indian films